Lyria may refer to:
 TGV Lyria, a brand name used for TGV railway lines connecting France and Switzerland
 Lyria (gastropod), a gastropod genus
 Lyria (band), a Brazilian symphonic alternative metal band
 Lyria, a character in the video game Granblue Fantasy

See also
 Llyrìa
 Liria (disambiguation)
 Lyra (disambiguation)